Dragomir Denchev Markov (born April 8, 1971 in Sofia) is a retired backstroke and butterfly swimmer from Bulgaria. He was a member of the Bulgarian National Swimming Team (four men and one woman) at the 1992 Summer Olympics in Barcelona, Spain. He placed 32nd in the Men's 100 metres Butterfly and 34th place in the Men's 100 metres Backstroke.

References

 sports-reference

1971 births
Living people
Male backstroke swimmers
Male butterfly swimmers
Bulgarian male swimmers
Olympic swimmers of Bulgaria
Swimmers at the 1992 Summer Olympics
Sportspeople from Sofia